Calotte may refer to:

 Calotte (architecture), a round cavity or depression in architecture
 Calotte or zucchetto, a plain skull cap, specifically those worn by ecclesiastics
 Calotte (Belgium), used among students at Belgian catholic universities as a student cap
 Calotte or space-filling model used in molecule modelling
 Calotte, the anterior region (head) of a Dicyemida parasite
 a term of archaeology to indicate the part of a skull otherwise known as a skullcap

See also
 Calotes, a genus of lizards